The Ukrainian Helsinki Group was founded on November 9, 1976, as the "Ukrainian Public Group to Promote the Implementation of the Helsinki Accords on Human Rights" to monitor human rights in Ukraine. The group was active until 1981 when all members were jailed.

The group's goal was to monitor the Soviet Government's compliance with the Helsinki Accords, which ensure human rights. The members of the group based the group's legal viability on the provision in the Helsinki Final Act, Principle VII, which established the rights of individuals to know and act upon their rights and duties.

Details
Since 1977, the Ukrainian Helsinki Group foreign affiliate began its activities with the participation of Petro Hryhorenko, Nadiya Svitlychna, Leonid Plyushch. Later, Nina Strokata Karavanska and Nadiya Svitlichna began to host the human rights themed radio programs on Svoboda radio.

From the very early days, the group endured the repressions of Soviet authorities. In February 1977 the authorities began to arrest members of the Ukrainian Helsinki Group, and within two years all the founding members were tried and sentenced to exile or imprisonment for 7 to 10 years.

At the end of 1979, six members of the group were forced to emigrate, while other Ukrainian dissidents were not allowed to do so. Soviet authorities used punitive medicine: some Ukrainian Helsinki Group members (Oksana Meshko, Vasyl Stus, Petro Sichko and his son Vasyl) were threatened with committal to a psychiatric unit. Hanna Mykhailenko, who was a sympathizer of the Group, was detained in a psychiatric hospital in 1980. Bad conditions in Soviet camps and prisons caused the deaths of UHG members Oleksiy Tykhy and Vasyl Stus later on.

In 1982, the 'Initiative Group for the Defense of Believers and the Church' was established, which considered itself a part of the Helsinki movement in Ukraine. Its organizers, Yosyp Terelia and Vasyl Kobryn, were both sentenced in 1985.

Some political prisoners from outside of Ukraine (Mart Niklus, an Estonian, and Viktoras Petkus, a Lithuanian) announced their symbolic membership in the Group in 1983.

By 1983, the Ukrainian Helsinki Group had 37 members, of whom 22 were in prison camps, 5 were in exile, 6 emigrated to the West, 3 were released and were living in Ukraine, 1 (Mykhailo Melnyk) committed suicide.

On July 7, 1988, members of the group established and officially registered the Ukrainian Helsinki Association which in 1990 transformed itself into the Ukrainian Republican Party. In 2004, the Ukrainian Helsinki Human Rights Union was established as an association of public human rights organizations.

Members 
By the estimations of Vasyl Ovsiienko, the Group involved 41 persons in total. About 27 of them were sentenced by Soviet authorities to prisons and camps directly for their membership in the association. They spent altogether about 170 years in prisons, mental hospitals and in exile.

UHG abroad
 Petro Grigorenko
 Leonid Plyushch
 Nina Strokata

In 1980, for UHG abroad, Nadiya Svitlychna became an editor of the "Herald of Repressions in Ukraine" publication.

Arrested members 
By 1982, most members of the Ukrainian Helsinki Group had been arrested:

In Mordovia prisons
  Levko Lukyanenko
  Mykola Rudenko
  Oleksiy Tykhyi
  Svyatoslav Karavansky
  Volodymyr Romanyuk
  Iryna Senyk
  Danylo Shumuk
  Yuriy Shukhevych
  Oksana Popovych

See also
Moscow Helsinki Group
 Ukrainian Christian Democratic Party
 Human rights movement in the Soviet Union
 List of members, known members

References

External links
Ukrainian Helsinki Union (article from UaWarExplained.com)
Ukrainian Helsinki Human rights Union
Ukrainian Helsinki Group - Documents, Members, Chronology 

 
Organizations established in 1976
1976 establishments in the Soviet Union
1976 establishments in Ukraine